Another Bad Creation (sometimes called ABC for short) was an American hip hop and new jack swing group from Atlanta, Georgia who were active in the early 1990s.

History
ABC consisted of Romelle "RoRo" Chapman, Chris Sellers, David Shelton and brothers Demetrius and Marliss ("Red" and "Mark", respectively) Pugh, as well as Adrian "G.A." (General Austin) Witcher. They were discovered by Michael Bivins.
ABC's debut album Coolin' at the Playground Ya Know! was released on February 11, 1991. The album's two biggest singles were the first and second singles: "Iesha" and "Playground", respectively, which reached the top ten on both the R&B and pop charts (the latter was also the group's only showing on the Dance chart). A cover of New Edition's song "Jealous Girl" followed, as well as the singles "Spydermann" and "My World". The album reached #7 on the Billboard 200 and eventually went platinum.

During this time, Mark and Dave appeared among other children (including Macaulay Culkin) in a scene of Michael Jackson's video "Black or White". Also during this time, all the members of ABC made their only movie appearance to date, as characters in The Meteor Man (which also featured appearances from various other musicians). They all dyed their hair blonde for the movie, a style they also showcased in the video for the East Coast Family's only collective song, "1-4-All-4-1".

On March 3, 1991 Another Bad Creation appeared on sketch comedy show In Living Color. Keenen Ivory Wayans introduced them by comparing them to The Jackson 5, New Edition, and The Boys. The group then sang "Iesha".

ABC's second album It Ain't What U Wear, It's How U Play It was released on September 21, 1993. Neither the album nor any of its singles charted on any Billboard chart.

Discography

Albums

Singles

References

External links
 
 Another Bad Creation at Discogs
 

American boy bands
Musical groups established in 1990
Musical groups disestablished in 1993
African-American musical groups 
New jack swing music groups
Motown artists
Musical groups from Atlanta
Child musical groups